Ulmen is a Verbandsgemeinde ("collective municipality") in the district Cochem-Zell, in Rhineland-Palatinate, Germany. The seat of the Verbandsgemeinde is in Ulmen.

The Verbandsgemeinde Ulmen consists of the following Ortsgemeinden ("local municipalities"):

Verbandsgemeinde in Rhineland-Palatinate